is a freemium puzzle video game featuring Pokémon characters developed by Jupiter Corporation and published by Nintendo and The Pokémon Company for the Nintendo 3DS. The title is part of the "Picross" nonogram series that use number-based grid puzzles to reveal pictures. It was released as a downloadable title on the Nintendo 3DS eShop worldwide in December 2015.

Gameplay

Pokémon Picross follows the typical format of nonogram puzzles, in which players must use numbers depicted on a grid to determine which sections to fill and not fill in. In this a game a twist is added in which, when a puzzle is completed, players are rewarded with a Pokémon based on the puzzle they cleared. These Pokémon can be set before starting a puzzle and can utilise various abilities based on their type. For example, Electric-type Pokémon can slow down the levels' timer, while Fire-types can automatically fill in certain areas of the grid in a cross-shape pattern. Each Pokémon has a cooldown period after their ability is used, and their ability may be limited to grids under a certain size, anywhere from 10x10 to 20x15 (the smallest and largest Pokémon puzzle sizes respectively).

The game's freemium elements revolve around items known as Picrites, which are required to perform various actions such as unlocking new areas, increasing the number of Pokémon that can be set, opening up Mega Evolution and Alt World stages, and instantly restoring the Energy gauge (the latter of which is replenished over time). In addition to purchasing them with Nintendo eShop funds, players can obtain Picrites by clearing certain objectives in each stage (such as using a particular Pokémon or beating the stage within a certain time limit), playing the Daily Challenge (which tasks players with clearing several smaller puzzles in quick succession), and unlocking certain achievements as they play. Clearing certain stage objectives also unlocks Mural Tiles, which contain individual Picross puzzles as part of a larger mural puzzle. The game also features a spending cap in which, if the player spends a certain amount of funds on Picrites, they will be able to receive additional Picrites for free.

Development
Pokémon Picross was first announced on a November 12, 2015 Nintendo Direct broadcast, with a worldwide release date set for the following month. The title's developer, Jupiter Corporation, had originally planned to release a game called Pokémon Picross on the Game Boy Color 16 years earlier. Although previews appeared in Japanese gaming magazines in Spring 1999, that version was ultimately cancelled. In September 2020, a playable version of the original Game Boy iteration was discovered in the Nintendo "Gigaleak 3" alongside other data and unreleased games.

Reception

Pokémon Picross received "generally favorable" reviews, according to video game review aggregator Metacritic. Kyle Hilliard of Game Informer found that the game was "difficult to recommend universally", and that the free-to-play mechanic was not conducive to a Picross-style puzzle title, stating "Free-to-play is not inherently a bad thing... but unlike most successful free-to-play games, Picross puzzles are not randomized nor worth replaying." The editor did commend the title for not being an "endless money-sink" by having the in-game currency become free after 5,000 are purchased. Destructoid found the game to be an improvement over previous Picross entries, stating "Aside from the strangely disguised pricing scheme, the new additions to Pokémon Picross exceed expectations," giving special mention to its mission mechanic, the unlocking of "mural" images, and "mega rows" that encourage non-standard play.

References

External links

2015 video games
Cancelled Game Boy games
Cancelled Game Boy Color games
Free-to-play video games
Jupiter (company) games
Nintendo 3DS eShop games
Nintendo 3DS-only games
Nintendo 3DS games
Nintendo Network games
Nonograms
Picross (video game series)
Puzzle video games
Video games developed in Japan
Pokémon spin-off games